The following is a timeline of the history of the city of Managua, Nicaragua.

Prior to 20th century

 1846 – Villa de Managua attains city status.
 1852 – Managua becomes capital of Nicaragua.
 1874 – Huellas de Acahualinca (fossils) discovered.
 1875 – Managua Department (administrative division) established.
 1876 – Flood.
 1885 – Earthquake.
 1899 –  (park) established.

20th century

1900s–1960s

 1901 –  becomes mayor.
 1913 – Roman Catholic Archdiocese of Managua established.
 1915 – Xolotlan Airport built.
 1926 – La Prensa newspaper begins publication.
 1931 – March 31: 1931 Nicaragua earthquake.
 1934
 February 21: Assassination of Augusto César Sandino.
 Cinema Gonzalez opens.
 1938 – Cathedral of Managua built.
 1948 – National Stadium built.
 1950 – Population: 109,352.
 1951 – Alianza Francesa de Managua founded.
 1952 – Banco de América Central founded.
 1960 – Jesuit Central American University founded.
 1961 – Teatro Experimental de Managua active.
 1968
 Earthquake.
 Las Mercedes Airport expanded.
 1969 – Rubén Darío National Theatre opens.

1970s–1990s

 1970 –  built.
 1971 – Population: 398,514.
 1972 – December 23: 1972 Nicaragua earthquake.
 1974
 December: Sandinistas raid residence of government official in Los Robles.
 Metrocentro Managua shopping centre in business.
 1975 – Centro Comercial Plaza España (shopping mall) built in Bolonia.
 1978 – January 10: Assassination of Pedro Joaquín Chamorro Cardenal; protest ensues.
 1979
 July 19–20: Sandinistas in power.
 Masaya Volcano National Park established near city.
 Population: 608,020 (estimate).
 1983 – National University of Engineering established.
 1987 – Deportivo Walter Ferretti (football team) headquartered in Managua.
 1990
 Peace Park inaugurated.
 Arnoldo Alemán becomes mayor.
 1991
 November: Sandinista unrest.
 Tiscapa Lagoon Natural Reserve established.
 1992 –  in business.
 1993 – Metropolitan Cathedral of the Immaculate Conception built.
 1995 – El Malecon park established.
 1996 – La Jornada magazine begins publication.
 1997 – Institute of History of Nicaragua and Central America headquartered in city.
 1998 – Plaza Inter shopping center in business.
 1999 – April: FSLN demonstration.
 2000
 "FSLN wins municipal elections in Managua."
 Parmalat Futbol Clube formed.
 Herty Lewites becomes mayor.

21st century

 2005
  (Japanese park) established.
 2009
 Alexis Argüello becomes mayor; dies in office.
  in business.
 Population: 985,143 metro.
 2011 – Nicaragua National Football Stadium opens.
 2014
 April 10: 2014 Nicaragua earthquake.
 September 6: Managua event (explosion).
 2018 - April: Economic protest begins.

See also

 List of universities in Managua
 Managua history
List of years in Nicaragua

References

This article incorporates information from the Spanish Wikipedia.

Bibliography
 .
 .
 .
 .

External links

 Digital Public Library of America. Items related to Managua, various dates

Managua
 
Managua
Nicaragua history-related lists
Years in Nicaragua
Managua